Royal Air Force Alconbury or more simply RAF Alconbury is an active Royal Air Force station near Huntingdon, England. The airfield is in the civil parish of The Stukeleys, close to the villages of Great Stukeley, Little Stukeley, and Alconbury. Flying operations are no longer based at the site, with most of the land, including the runway, having been sold in 2009 to become the new settlement of Alconbury Weald.

History
Opened in 1938 for use by RAF Bomber Command, the station has been used from 1942 by the United States Army Air Force. It was occupied by the 93d Bomb Group of the Eighth Air Force: visitors included King George VI who visited the site and saw the Boeing B-17 Flying Fortresses there on 13 November 1942.

It was announced by The Pentagon on 8 January 2015 that RAF Alconbury and RAF Molesworth would be closing by 2020.  Most of the units at Alconbury and Molesworth will be moved to RAF Croughton, along with the personnel. However, changing security conditions in Europe and resurgent politico-military moves by Russia have caused USEUCOM to begin reconsidering these closure actions in 2017 and actual closures remain in flux.

Royal Air Force use

 15 Squadron from 15 April 1940 to 15 May 1940 operating the Bristol Blenheim IV - temporary move from RAF Wyton.
 40 Squadron from 2 February 1941 to 31 October 1941 operating the Vickers Wellington IC - moved to RAF Luqa, Malta.
 52 Squadron detachments from RAF Upwood during 1939 with the Fairey Battle and Avro Anson.
 156 Squadron formed at Alconbury on 14 February 1942 from elements of 40 Squadron with the Vickers Wellington, moved to RAF Warboys in August 1942.
 A Detachment from No. 1 Photographic Reconnaissance Unit RAF (April 1985)
 No. 3 Photographic Reconnaissance Unit RAF (1941)
 No. XV Conversion Flight (January 1942 - May 1942)
 Sub site of No. 264 Maintenance Unit RAF (November 1945 - September 1948)

USAAF use

 92nd Bombardment Group (Heavy)
 325th Bombardment Squadron
 326th Bombardment Squadron
 327th Bombardment Squadron
 407th Bombardment Squadron
 93rd Bombardment Group (Heavy)
 328th Bombardment Squadron
 329th Bombardment Squadron
 330th Bombardment Squadron
 409th Bombardment Squadron
 95th Bombardment Group (Heavy)
 334th Bombardment Squadron
 335th Bombardment Squadron
 336th Bombardment Squadron
 412th Bombardment Squadron
 482nd Bombardment Group (Provisional)
 812th Bombardment Squadron
 813th Bombardment Squadron
 814th Bombardment Squadron
 801st Bombardment Group (Provisional)
 36th Bombardment Squadron
 406th Bombardment Squadron
 788th Bombardment Squadron
 850th Bombardment Squadron

United States Air Force use

 10th Tactical Reconnaissance Wing (1959-94)
 85th Bombardment Squadron ?
 527th Tactical Fighter Training Aggressor Squadron  (1976-88)

Based units 
Units based at RAF Alconbury.

 United States Air Force 
United States Air Forces in Europe - Air Forces Africa (USAFE-AFAFRICA)

 501st Combat Support Wing
 Headquarters 501st Combat Support Wing
 423rd Air Base Group 
 423rd Civil Engineer Squadron
 423rd Communications Squadron
 423rd Force Support Squadron
 423rd Medical Squadron
 423rd Security Forces Squadron

See also
 List of Royal Air Force stations
United States Air Force in the United Kingdom

References

Citations

Bibliography

External links

 501st Combat Support Wing

Royal Air Force stations in Huntingdonshire
Royal Air Force stations in Cambridgeshire
1938 establishments in England
Installations of the United States Air Force in the United Kingdom
Airfields of the VIII Bomber Command in Cambridgeshire
Military airbases established in 1938
Royal Air Force stations of World War II in the United Kingdom